The teres major muscle is a muscle of the upper limb. It attaches to the scapula and the humerus and is one of the seven scapulohumeral muscles. It is a thick but somewhat flattened muscle.

The teres major muscle (from Latin teres, meaning "rounded") is positioned above the latissimus dorsi muscle and assists in the extension and medial rotation of the humerus. This muscle is commonly confused as a rotator cuff muscle, but it is not because it does not attach to the capsule of the shoulder joint, unlike the teres minor muscle for example.

Structure
The teres major muscle originates on the dorsal surface of the inferior angle and the lower part of the lateral border of the scapula.

The fibers of teres major insert into the medial lip of the intertubercular sulcus of the humerus.

Relations
The tendon, at its insertion, lies behind that of the latissimus dorsi, from which it is separated by a bursa, the two tendons being, however, united along their lower borders for a short distance. The fibers of these two muscles run parallel to each other, and both muscles insert at the crest of the lesser tubercle of the humerus (also described as the medial lip of the intertubercular sulcus).

Together with teres minor muscle, teres major muscle forms the axillary space, through which several important arteries and veins pass.

Innervation 
Teres major is supplied primarily by the lower subscapular nerve and additionally by the thoracodorsal nerve (middle subscapular nerve). These are distal to the upper subscapular nerve. These three nerves branch off the posterior cord of the brachial plexus. The nerves that innervate teres major consist of fibers from spinal nerves C5-C8.

Function
The teres major is a medial rotator and adductor of the humerus and assists the latissimus dorsi in drawing the previously raised humerus downwards and backwards (extension, but not hyperextension). It also helps stabilise the humeral head in the glenoid cavity.

Injury 
Isolated teres major injuries are rare. They are almost exclusively encountered in professional and high-level recreational athletes— baseball pitchers in particular. These injuries can be debilitating, requiring lengthy rehabilitation periods and missed seasons of athletics. No clear indications for surgical treatment exist. Outcomes have been generally good after both nonoperative and operative treatment.

Additional images

See also

Accessory muscles of the scapula

References

External links

PTCentral

Muscles of the upper limb
Shoulder adductors
Shoulder extensors
Shoulder medial rotators